The 1977 London–Sydney Marathon, officially Singapore Airlines Rally London-Sydney 1977, was the second running of the London-Sydney Marathon. The rally took place between 14 August and 27 September 1977. The event covered 19,000 miles (30,000 km) through Europe, Asia and Australia. It was won by Andrew Cowan, Colin Malkin and Mike Broad, driving a Mercedes-Benz 280E.

Background

The success of the 1968 London-Sydney Marathon would inspire Australian advertising publicist Wylton Dickson, who had no previous links to rallying to organised the World Cup Rally, which took place in 1970 and again in 1974. But following the controversy over the running of the 1974 event, the World Cup Rally was cancelled and Dickson decided to organise another London to Sydney Marathon in 1977, with sponsorship from Singapore Airlines, who were celebrating their 30th Anniversary, by running the longest car rally in history. The route would see competitors cross Europe and Asia in the first twelve days of the event before the cars would be shipped from India to Malaysia with competitors driving through the country and into Singapore for the next eleven days before being shipped to Australia for the last seven days of the rally.

Results

References

Further reading

External links
 The 1977 Singapore Airlines London to Sydney Rally – website commemorating the event

Rally raid races
Rally racing series
London-Sydney Marathon